ISO/IEC/IEEE 42010 Systems and software engineering — Architecture description is an international standard for architecture descriptions of systems and software.

Overview
ISO/IEC/IEEE 42010:2011 defines requirements on the description of system, software and enterprise architectures. It aims to standardise the practice of architecture description by defining standard terms, presenting a conceptual foundation for expressing, communicating and reviewing architectures and specifying requirements that apply to architecture descriptions, architecture frameworks and architecture description languages.

Following its predecessor, IEEE 1471, the standard makes a strict distinction between architectures and architecture descriptions.

The description of ISO/IEC/IEEE 42010 in this article is based upon the standard published in 2011.

History of ISO/IEC/IEEE 42010
The origin of the standard was the fast track international standardization of IEEE 1471:2000. The standard was originally balloted as ISO/IEC DIS 25961. It was subsequently adopted and published as ISO/IEC 42010:2007 which was identical with IEEE 1471:2000.

In 2006, ISO/IEC JTC1/SC7 WG 42 and IEEE Computer Society launched a coordinated revision of this standard to address: harmonization with ISO/IEC 12207 and ISO/IEC 15288; alignment with other ISO/IEC architecture standards (e.g. ISO/IEC 10746 Reference Model Open Distributed Processing); the specification of architecture frameworks and architecture description languages; architecture decision capture; and correspondences for model and view consistency.

In July 2011, the Final Draft International Standard was balloted and approved (21-0) by ISO member bodies. The corresponding IEEE version, P42010/D9, was approved as a revised standard by the IEEE-SA Standards Board on 31 October 2011. ISO/IEC/IEEE 42010:2011 was published by ISO on 24 November 2011.

References

External links 
 ISO/IEC/IEEE 42010 website
 A documentation framework for architecture decisions based on 42010
 Views and Beyond: The SEI Approach to Architecture Documentation 
 MEGAF is an infrastructure for realizing architecture frameworks that conform to the definition of architecture framework provided in the ISO/IEC/IEEE 42010 standard.

42010
42010
42010
Software architecture